is a Japanese manga artist known for writing the Pokémon Adventures manga.

Works

Awards
In 2009, the first Nickelodeon Comics awards gave the award for Favorite Manga Series to Best of Pokémon Adventures, written by Hidenori Kusaka and Mato (Viz)

In 2016, Hidenori Kusaka won the Inkpot Award with Satoshi Yamamoto at Comic-Con International.

References

External links
 
 

Living people
Pokémon manga
Manga artists
Year of birth missing (living people)